Century is a census-designated place and coal town in Barbour County, West Virginia, United States. Its population was 115 as of the 2010 census.

The community's coal deposits were believed to be abundant enough to last a century, hence the name.

References

Census-designated places in Barbour County, West Virginia
Census-designated places in West Virginia
Coal towns in West Virginia